Liam J. McLaughlin (born January 16, 1968) is the former Council President of the Yonkers City Council. He is a practicing attorney and partner at McLaughlin & Zerafa, LLP, an estates and trusts firm. On November 7, 2017 McLaughlin lost his re-election bid in a Democratic upset against attorney and CIA veteran Mike Khader. McLaughlin now is serving as Inspector General for the City of Yonkers.

Early career and background
McLaughlin grew up in Yonkers, New York and attended Cardinal Spellman High School and Fordham University where he received a bachelor's degree in accounting in 1989. He became an auditor at Ernst and Young and went on to receive a Juris Doctor from New York Law School in 1996.

Political career
Involved with a local neighborhood association, as well as the Ancient Order of Hibernians, McLaughlin first ran for the City Council in Yonkers, New York's fourth largest city and one of the "Big Five" cities in the State, in a 1997 election for the fourth district council seat. He scored an impressive 38% of the vote as a third-party candidate on the Conservative Party of New York State line. He won the seat outright during the 1999 general election after winning the Republican primary and served from 2000 to 2010, including service as Minority Leader and Majority Leader.

He ran for the New York State Senate in 2010 after being term-limited off the Council against State Senator Andrea Stewart-Cousins, garnering 45% of the vote. He then returned to private law practice and served as an adjunct professor at Manhattan College.

In 2013, he was elected Council President. His first local law gave a school tax exemption to military veterans, which made Yonkers the first major city in New York to offer that benefit to service members. While Republicans across the nation surged to power on the coat tails on Donald Trump, McLaughlin was tossed out of office, beaten by Mike Khader, a son of Jordanian immigrants. With McLaughlin's defeat, the Yonkers City Council has changed to Democratic control. Khader won handily, defeating McLaughlin 54% to 46%.

Electoral history

Yonkers City Council

New York State Senate

Yonkers City Council President

External links
 Official Biography
 Law Office

Notes

 

|-

Living people
Fordham University alumni
New York (state) Republicans
People from Yonkers, New York
1968 births